Tiki Lafe (born 11 May 1954) was the Member of Parliament of Malaysia for the Mas Gading constituency in Sarawak from 1999 to 2013, representing the Sarawak Progressive Democratic Party (SPDP) in the then-ruling Barisan Nasional coalition.

Tiki was a Deputy Minister of Rural and Regional Development in the Barisan Nasional government (appointed in 2004), but was left out of the ministry after the 2008 election. His loss of the ministry triggered unhappiness among the Bidayuh community in Sarawak that there were no longer any Bidayuh appointed to the ministry. He was dropped as a Barisan Nasional candidate for the 2013 election. He recontested the seat as an independent, but was defeated by the Barisan Nasional candidate Nogeh Gumbek. Presently he is a member of Malaysian United Indigenous Party or Parti Pribumi Bersatu Malaysia (BERSATU), a component of Pakatan Harapan (PH) coalition, in which he joined in 2018.

Election results

Honours
  :
  Companion Class I of the Exalted Order of Malacca (DMSM) – Datuk (2003)
  :
  Knight Commander of the Order of the Perak State Crown (DPMP) – Dato’ (2008)

References

Living people
1954 births
People from Sarawak
Members of the Dewan Rakyat
21st-century Malaysian politicians
Bidayuh people
Progressive Democratic Party (Malaysia) politicians
Former Malaysian United Indigenous Party politicians
Independent politicians in Malaysia